DP Leonis (abbreviated DP Leo) is binary star system in the equatorial constellation of Leo. It is a variable star that ranges in apparent visual magnitude from 17.5 down to 19. The system is located at a distance of approximately 990 light-years from the Sun based on parallax. It is a cataclysmic variable star of the AM Herculis-type also known as polars. The system comprises an eclipsing white dwarf and red dwarf in tight orbit (nearly 1.5 hours) and an extrasolar planet. This eclipsing variable was discovered by P. Biermann and associates in 1982 as the optical counterpart to the EINSTEIN X-ray source E1114+182.

Planetary system 
In 2010, Qian et al. announced the detection of a third body of planetary mass around the eclipsing binary system. The presence of a third body had already been suspected in 2002. The object is roughly 6 times more massive than Jupiter and is located 8.6 AU from the binary.

See also 
 NN Serpentis
 QS Virginis
 Lists of exoplanets

References 

M-type main-sequence stars
White dwarfs
Eclipsing binaries
Polars (cataclysmic variable stars)
Planetary systems with one confirmed planet
Leo (constellation)
Leonis, DP